Fernando Hurtado Álvarez (27 October 1927 – 23 April 1993) was a Chilean footballer. He played in three matches for the Chile national football team in 1953, two of them were A-class matches. He was also part of Chile's squad for the 1953 South American Championship.

Honours
Everton
 Chilean Primera División (2): 1950, 1952

References

External links
 

1927 births
1993 deaths
Chilean footballers
Chile international footballers
Everton de Viña del Mar footballers
Chilean Primera División players
Place of birth missing
Association football forwards